John Rider Klauder (born January 24, 1932) is an American professor of physics and mathematics, and author of over 250 published articles on physics.

He graduated from University of California, Berkeley in  1953 with a Bachelor of Science.  He received his PhD in 1959 from Princeton University where he was a student of John Archibald Wheeler.

A former head of the Theoretical Physics and Solid State Spectroscopy Departments of Bell Telephone Laboratories, he has been a visiting professor at Rutgers University, Syracuse University, and the University of Bern. In 1988 John Klauder was appointed Professor of Physics and Mathematics at the University of Florida. He was awarded the title of Distinguished Professor in 2006, and became Emeritus in 2010.

He was inducted as a Foreign Member of the Royal Norwegian Society of Sciences and Letters, and received the Onsager Medal in 2006 at NTNU (Norway).

He has also served on the Physics Advisory Panel of the National Science Foundation and been Editor of the Journal of Mathematical Physics, President of the International Association of Mathematical Physics, Associate Secretary-General of the International Union of Pure and Applied Physics.

Bibliography
Beyond Conventional Quantization
"When treated conventionally, certain systems yield trivial and unacceptable results. This book describes enhanced procedures, generally involving extended correspondence rules for the association of a classical and a quantum theory, which, when applied to such systems, yield nontrivial and acceptable results. Requiring only a modest prior knowledge of quantum mechanics and quantum field theory, this book will be of interest to graduate students and researchers in theoretical physics, mathematical physics, and mathematics."

Coherent States - Applications in Physics and Mathematical Physics - A brief introduction to Coherent States followed by a collection of useful articles. Authored with B. S. Skagerstam.
Fundamentals of Quantum Optics - Volume authored jointly with E. C. G. Sudarshan.
On Klauder's Path: A Field Trip - "A volume in celebration of his 60th birthday."

References 

21st-century American physicists
1932 births
Living people
University of Florida faculty
Royal Norwegian Society of Sciences and Letters
Presidents of the International Association of Mathematical Physics